Joyce Barbour (1901–1977) was an English actress. She was the wife of the actor Richard Bird.

Barbour was born in Birmingham on 27 March 1901 the daughter of Horace and Miriam Barbour, her father was an assurance clerk and later a hotel manager. She made her first stage appearance in Birmingham as a pantomime fairy in 1914. She first appeared on the London stage in 1925 at the Gaiety Theatre in the chorus.

Her theatre work included the original productions of Rodgers and Hart's Present Arms (1928), and Spring is Here (1929) on Broadway; and the musical Ever Green (1930) in London's West End. She also played in the original production of Noël Coward's Words and Music at the Adelphi Theatre, London, in 1932. In 1950 she appeared in Esther McCracken's Cry Liberty.

Barbour married actor Richard Bird in 1931 in London. She died on 16 March 1977 in Hospital at Northwood, Middlesex, aged 75.

Selected filmography
 Enchantment (1920) - Sophie Desmond
 Diamond Cut Diamond (1932)
 Sabotage (1936) - Renee
 For Valour (1937) - Barmaid
 Housemaster (1938) - Barbara Fane
 Saloon Bar (1940) - Sally
 Don't Take It to Heart (1944) - Harriet
 Stop Press Girl (1949) - Aunt Mab
 It Started in Paradise (1952) - Lady Burridge
 The Captain's Paradise (1953) - Mrs. Reid (housekeeper)
 The Main Chance (1964) - Madame. Rozanne

References

External links

1901 births
1977 deaths
Actresses from Birmingham, West Midlands
English stage actresses
English film actresses
English silent film actresses
20th-century English actresses
English television actresses